Cities Service Station, at the junction of 1st St. and Central Ave. in Afton, Oklahoma, was built before 1933.  It was listed on the National Register of Historic Places in 1995.

It was unusual for having restrooms and for the entrances of both sexes' restrooms being located on the exterior of the building.

References

Gas stations on the National Register of Historic Places in Oklahoma
National Register of Historic Places in Ottawa County, Oklahoma
Mission Revival architecture in Oklahoma
Buildings and structures completed in 1933
Citgo